Song Hyeong-keun (born 16 September 1974) is a South Korean former professional tennis player.

An Australian Open junior semi-finalist, Song had a best career singles ranking of 330 in the world and made his only ATP Tour main draw appearance at the 1992 Seoul Open.

Song was a men's team gold medalist at the 1998 Asian Games in Bangkok.

In 1999 he represented the South Korea Davis Cup team in a tie against New Zealand in Christchurch and played in two singles rubbers. This included the deciding fifth rubber, which he lost in four sets to Mark Nielsen.

Short in stature, Song had a game which was built around his two-handed backhand.

ITF Futures titles

Doubles: (3)

See also
List of South Korea Davis Cup team representatives

References

External links
 
 
 

1974 births
Living people
South Korean male tennis players
Tennis players at the 1998 Asian Games
Medalists at the 1998 Asian Games
Asian Games gold medalists for South Korea
Asian Games medalists in tennis
20th-century South Korean people